"Turn Your Love Around" is a pop/R&B single by George Benson. The song was written by Grammy winners Bill Champlin of Chicago, Steve Lukather of Toto and producer and guitarist Jay Graydon to help fill out Benson's 1981 greatest hits album, The George Benson Collection. The song won a Best R&B Song Grammy Award at the 25th Grammy Awards in 1983 for Champlin, Graydon, and Lukather as its co-writers.

Background
The inspiration for the song came to Graydon in the bathroom. He explained to Songfacts, "'Turn Your Love Around' was a gift, and it's the gift that keeps giving. I was in the bathroom when I came up with the melody, and I was sitting down, if you get my drift. Well, I got off the can as fast as I could and got to a cassette machine so I wouldn't forget it. George Benson was coming in town Tuesday, so I had four days to come up with a song for The George Benson Collection. And I was gettin' nothing. And then bang! I just came up with this melody for the chorus when I was in the bathroom."
The song was one of the first pop hits to use a Linn LM-1 drum machine, programmed by the session drummer Jeff Porcaro.

Personnel 
 George Benson – lead vocals
 Jay Graydon – guitar, synthesizer, arrangements
 Jai Winding – acoustic piano, Fender Rhodes
 Steve Lukather - piano melody
 David Foster – synthesizer
 David Paich – synthesizer bass 
 Jeff Porcaro – Linn LM-1 drum programming
 Gary Herbig – saxophone, flutes
 Bill Reichenbach Jr. – trombone 
 Chuck Findley – trumpet
 Jerry Hey – trumpet, horn arrangements 
 Bill Champlin – backing vocals 
 Venette Cloud – backing vocals
 Carmen Twillie – backing vocals

Chart performance

Weekly singles charts

Year-end charts

"Turn Your Love Around" reached number one on the soul singles charts and number five on the Billboard Hot 100 singles charts in early 1982, as well as the top ten on the jazz chart. It is ranked as the 27th biggest hit of 1982. In Canada, the song spent two weeks at number 10.

Cover versions
A version of "Turn Your Love Around" by Tony Di Bart was released in 1996.

Samples
This song was sampled on the album version of Lil' Kim's "Not Tonight" 
Spice 1's "The Thug In Me" and on the Japanese 1 million hit song "Da.Yo.Ne." by East End X Yuri in 1994.

References

External links
 
"Turn Your Love Around" [ Song Review] on Allmusic website

1981 singles
1982 singles
George Benson songs
Songs written by Jay Graydon
Songs written by Steve Lukather
1981 songs
Warner Records singles
Songs written by Bill Champlin